Gandu (Mandarin: 甘都镇) is a town in Hualong Hui Autonomous County, Haidong, Qinghai, China. In 2010, Gandu had a total population of 20,536: 10,040 males and 10,496 females: 6,629 aged under 14, 12,454 aged between 15 and 65 and 1,453 aged over 65.

References 

Township-level divisions of Qinghai
Haidong
Towns in China